Hot Wheels: World Race is a racing video game developed by Climax Brighton and published by THQ. The game is based on the television series Hot Wheels: World Race that was released by Hot Wheels and Mainframe Entertainment, and 35 Hot Wheels toy automobiles were released in conjunction with the television series to coincide with the 35th anniversary of the creation of the franchise. The game was released on October 29, 2003.

Gameplay 
The gameplay of World Race is similar to many other racing games. Players can do special tricks when in the air, which adds on to the players' car's boost. Collecting gold rings also increases the boost. The PC, GameCube, and PS2 versions each have multi-player, all of which are split-screen.

Reception 

The game received "mixed" reviews on all platforms except the Game Boy Advance version, which received "generally unfavorable reviews", according to video game review aggregator Metacritic.

References

External links 
 
    

2003 video games
Game Boy Advance games
Hot Wheels video games
GameCube games
PlayStation 2 games
Racing video games
Science fantasy video games
THQ games
Video games based on toys
Video games developed in the United Kingdom
Video games about parallel universes
Windows games